Causey Bank Mires  is a Site of Special Scientific Interest in the Derwentside district of County Durham, England. It lies alongside and to the west of the Tanfield Railway, just under 1 km north of the Causey Arch.

The site consists of a series of flushes with scrub, surrounded by acid and neutral grassland, a habitat with a restricted distribution in County Durham. A number of locally rare plant species are found in the area, including globe-flower, Trollius europaeus.

References

Sites of Special Scientific Interest in County Durham